George Ritchie (1808–1888) was a minister of the Church of Scotland, who served as Moderator of the General Assembly in 1870.

Life

He was born in the manse of Tarbolton in Ayrshire on 22 September 1808 the son of Rev John Ritchie, the local minister. He was educated locally then studied at Glasgow University graduating MA in 1827. He was licensed to preach by the Presbytery of Jedburgh in February 1832.

In August 1834 he was ordained as minister of St Boswells. In September 1843 he was moved to the high status charge of Jedburgh to replace Rev John Puves who had left in the Disruption of 1843. Edinburgh University granted him an honorary Doctor of Divinity in 1870.

In 1870 he succeeded the Rev Norman Macleod as Moderator of the General Assembly of the Church of Scotland the highest position in the Scottish Church. He was succeeded in turn by Rev Robert Horne Stevenson.

He retired in November 1876 and moved to Edinburgh living in a Georgian townhouse at 4 Charlotte Square.

He died at Charlotte Square on 29 May 1888. He was buried in Dean Cemetery.

Family
In March 1845 Ritchie married Elizabeth Bradfute Dudgeon (1825–1904), daughter of John Dudgeon of Almondhill, Kirkliston. Their children included:

Margaret Elizabeth Ritchie (1846–1925) married Rev Thomas Rogers of Fraserburgh and on being widowed married Robert Tenison Braithwaite.
David George Ritchie (1853–1903)
Elizabeth Christian Ritchie (b.1856) married Rev Dr David Scott of Dalziel

References
 

1808 births
1888 deaths
People from South Ayrshire
Alumni of the University of Glasgow
Moderators of the General Assembly of the Church of Scotland
Burials at the Dean Cemetery